Cothurnia elegans is a species of peritrichs in the family Vaginicolidae. It is found in Australia.

References

External links 
 Cothurnia elegans at the Atlas of Living Australia

Oligohymenophorea
Species described in 1930